The 1999–2000 Azadegan League was the ninth season of the Azadegan League that was won by Persepolis. The following is the final results of the Azadegan League's 1999–2000 football season.

Final classification

Results table

Summary
 Iranian football top division champions: Persepolis
 Relegated to 2nd division: Aboomoslem, Sanat Naft, Chooka Talesh, Irsotter Noshahr
 Promoted from the 2nd division: Bargh Shiraz, Esteghlal Rasht

Player statistics

Top goalscorers
15
  Mohannad Mahdi Al-Nadawi (Sanat Naft)
12
  Hamid Ebrahimi (Aboomoslem)
11
  Behnam Seraj (Persepolis)
10
  Hadi Abdollahzadeh (Aboomoslem)
  Mehdi Hasheminasab (Persepolis)
  Reza Sahebi (Zob Ahan)
  Bahman Tahmasebi (Irsotter) and (Esteghlal)
  Omid Zahedi (Foolad)
9
  Ali Samereh (Fajr Sepasi)
8
  Behnam Abolghasempour (Saipa)

Azadegan League seasons
Iran
1999–2000 in Iranian football